John Maynard (1508/09–1556) was an English politician.

He was a Member (MP) of the Parliament of England for St. Albans in October 1553 and November 1554.  One of the 39 Mp's who absented themselves from Parliament rather than take an oath acknowledging the authority of the Pope, during the reign of Mary I. Married to Margaret Rowlett then Dorothy Perrot.  Also related to Eleanor Tuke. 

His son by Dorothy Perrot Henry Maynard served as MP for St. Albans in the parliaments of 1586, 1588, 1592, and 1597.

References

1509 births
1556 deaths
English MPs 1553 (Mary I)
English MPs 1554–1555